Breakaway (also known as Escape from Madness) is a 1990 Australian thriller film starring Bruce Boxleitner, Bruce Myles and Deborah Unger. It is directed by Don McLennan.

Plot
An escaped prisoner abducts an accountant as he tracks a rodeo fair which is sheltering his wife.

Production
Filming took place in Victoria, Australia from 31 July – 9 September 1989.

Release
The film was released on video on a dubbed VHS in Germany by Highlight Video, on a Dutch-Subtitled VHS in the Netherlands by Excalibur Benelux and in Canada on NTSC VHS by Alliance Releasing. In the United Kingdom, it was released on video as Escape from Madness.

The film has never been released on any format in the United States.

References

External links
Breakaway at IMDb
Breakaway (1990) at Ozmovies

1990 films
1990 thriller films
Australian thriller films
1990s English-language films
Films directed by Don McLennan
1990s Australian films